The List of shipwrecks in 1762 includes some ships sunk, wrecked or otherwise lost during 1762.

January

3 January

8 January

12 January

Unknown date

February

10 February

21 February

22 February

24 February

Unknown date

March

15 March

18 March

22 March

Unknown date

April

6 April

Unknown date

May

7 May

22 May

Unknown date

June

21 June

July

Unknown date

August

12 August

15 August

26 August

27 August

31 August

Unknown date

September

3 September

14 September

15 September

18 September

19 September

24 September

Unknown date

October

3 October

25 October

26 October

30 October

Unknown date

November

11 November

15 November

27 November

29 November

Unknown date

December

12 December

15 December

18 December

Unknown date

Unknown date

References

1762